Lea Garofalo (Petilia Policastro, 24 August 1971 – Milan, 24 November 2009) was an Italian justice collaborator and a victim of the 'Ndrangheta. Originally believed to have been dissolved in acid, she was murdered and her body burned.

According to the deposition of Carmine Venturino, she was hit with a mast while her body was burning. Her face became completely swollen.

Biography

Lea Garofalo was the sister of Floriano Garofalo, a 'Ndrangehta boss whose affairs were centered in the town of Petilla Policastro, and the companion of Carlo Cosco, with whom she had a child named Denise.

On 7 May 1996, the Carabinieri of Milan captured Florano Garofalo during a blitz held in Via Montello 6. On 7 June 2005, nine years after the arrest and absolution at the first degree process, Floriano was shot during an ambush in Pagliarelle, a faction of Petilla Policastro.

In 2002, Lea decided to collaborate with the Italian Police, revealing remarkable information related to the internal feud that counter-posed the Garofalo and the Cosco families. Subsequently, she was interrogated by the Italian public prosecutor Salvatore Dolceto, who acknowledged the drug traffic brought out by the Cosco brethren under the approval of the Italian boss Salvatore Ceraudo. Additionally, she claimed her brother-in-law Giuseppe Cosco, nicknamed Totonno U lupu, had killed Floriano in the courtyard of Lea's home. She also attributed a role to Cosco in the Garofalo's murder, giving a possible crime's first cause.

In 2002, Lea Garofalo and her daughter Denise were admitted to the Italian protection program (in Italian: Servizio centrale di protezione dei collaboratori di giustizia) and were moved to Campobasso. Four years later, the protection was revoked due to the purported lack of importance of her contribution to the Italian magistrates. She was also described not to be a trustworthy testifier. She filed a petition to the Italian administrative justice, but the Tribunale Amministrativo Regionale confirmed the nullification act. Lea then appealed to the Council of State and got the right to be readmitted in the protection program as a justice collaborator, but not as a judiciary testifier. In April 2009, she suddenly ended any concerns with the protection program and chose to change her contacts in Petilia Policastro, while remaining in Campobasso in order to allow Denise to finish the scholastic year.

Failed kidnapping attempt
Carlo Cosco, who lived between Milan and Petilla Policastro, helped Lea to find a new home in Campobasso. On 5 May 2009, Massimo Sabatino introduced himself under deception into Lea's home to kidnap and kill her. Thanks to the timely intervention of Denise, who that day had not been at school, Lea was able to escape the ambush and go to the Carabinieri's station to report what had happened.

The investigation about the episode would be accelerated only after her death. On 4 February 2010, Carlo Casco was put under an injunction, along with Carlo Sabatino who had been charged for drug dealing and then imprisoned in Milan since December 2009. On 28 April 2009, Lea addressed a letter to the then Italian President of Republic Giorgio Napolitano, in which she complained that although she had been legally qualified as a justice collaborator, she had received legal support which was lacking from any point of view, to have lost work and all her social relations, and that legal expenses had compelled her to sell her home.

The ambush and the murder
On 20 November 2009, Cosco drew Lea to Milan with the excuse of talking with her about the future of Denise. Lea had been out of the Italian justice protection program for several months. On the evening of 24 November, Carlo brought Lea to an apartment, when Denise was not nearby. Vito Cosco, nicknamed "Sergio", was waiting in the hall. Lea was killed and her body was put into the hands of Carmine Venturino, Rosario Curcio and Massimo Sabatino.

Her body was moved to San Fruttuoso, in Monza, where it was completely burned over three days. With regards to the disposal of her body, Carmine Venturino, after his first degree sentence, began to reveal a series of particulars which allowed the Italian police to find Lea's bones and more than 2,000 other fragments.

Investigations and processes
The investigations were conducted by the Direzione Distrettuale Antimafia of Milan and by Investigative Nucleus Homicide Team of the Arma dei Carabinieri of Milan. In October 2010, the Italian magistrate signed the detention mandates for Carlo Cosco, Massimo Sabatino, Giuseppe Cosco «Smith», Vito Cosco «Sergio», Carmine Venturino and Rosario Curcio. On 24 February 2010, they also arrested two others, native of Cormano, who had sold the land of San Fruttuoso before the discovery of Lea's remains.

Denise Garofalo was the key judiciary test of the process, after her decision to depose her father. On 23 November 2011, Paola Severino appointed the court president Filippo Grisolla as the Cabinet Chief of Italian Minister of Justice and Grace, thus making the process null. Due to the legal incompatibility between the two chairs, the defense barristers asked and achieved the annulment of the whole procedure, including the tests'  declarations.

On 30 March 2012, the six inmates were sentenced for person's sequester, homicide and corpse disruption, while the mafia's aggravating factor wasn't recognized; Carlo Cosco and his brother Vito were condemned to life imprisonment of which two years should be in isolation, while Giuseppe Cosco, Rosario Curcio, Massimo Sabatino and Carmine Venturino (the former boyfriend of Denise Garofalo) were condemned to life imprisonment and to a year of solitary confinement.

After the Venturino's declarations, Lea's remains were found in San Fruttuoso, at an archaeological excavation with the involvement of the Institute of Legal Medicine of Milan. On 28 May 2013, the Assizes Court of Milan confirmed four of the six life imprisonment condemnations provided by the first degree process. More specifically, the life imprisonment was confirmed for Carlo and Vito Cosco, Rosario Curcio and Massimo Sabatino; Carmine Sabatino was sentenced to 25 years of prison, while Giuseppe Cosco was absolved not to have committed the crime; additionally, the Court ordered the economic reparation in favor to the civil parts of the process: Lea Garofalo's mother, daughter Denise, sister Marisa, and to the Municipality of Milan.
 
On 18 December 2014, the Italian Supreme Court of Cassation confirmed all the convictions which had been sentenced by the Corte di Assise e di Appello of Milan.

Awards and honors
 14 March 2018: Lea Garofalo was decorated with the Medaglia d'oro al merito civile by the Italian President of Republic Sergio Mattarella, with the following motivation:

Memorials 

 21 March each year the Libera'''s network of associations engaged against the mafia commemorates Lea Garofalo's death;
 1 April 2012 the commune of Monza accepted the invitation of the website  Daw-blog.com,and placed a commemorative plaque in the San Fruttuoso's cemetery, near the place where the woman was tortured and killed;
 December 2012, it was published Il coraggio di dire no. Lea Garofalo, la donna che sfidò la 'ndrangheta, the fist biography dedicated to Lea Garofalo;
 19 October 2013 there were the "civil funerals" of Lea Garofalo in Piazza Beccaria, in Milan, in the presence of the major Giuliano Pisapia and don Luigi Ciotti. At the same time, a public garden was entitled in memory of Lea Garofalo in Via Montello. On the same day, there were implanted a series of wintry Magnolias in the garden of the Biblioteca al Parco, near the Parco Sempione;
 7 September 2013 the municipality of Castelfranco Emilia named the local public library in honor of Lea Garofalo;
 July 2014, at Savignano sul Panaro, the Parco del Coraggio, a public garden to remember the courage of Lea Garofalo was opened. On 4 March 2015, after the visit of don Luigi Ciotti, an oak was donated to the park;
 18 November 2015 RAI1 aired the film Lea, produced by the RAI and directed by Marco Tullio Giordana, with Vanessa Scalera in the clothes of Lea Garofalo;
 2015, the major of Catanzaro Sergio Abramo entitled the San Leonardo's public gardens to Lea Garofalo;
 9 January 2016 the circle of Young Democrats of Crotone dedicated a commemorative plaque to Lea Garofalo, in the presence of Marisa Garofalo, Lea's sister;
 2016, di Ilaria Ferramosca e Chiara Abastanotti released the graphic novel whose title was Lea Garofalo, una madre contro la ndrangheta, with the contributions of Daniela Marcone (vice president of Libera) and of Marika Demaria;
 11 November 2016 the Litfiba dedicated to Lea the song Maria Coraggio within the album Eutòpia, whose videoclip was published on 10 March 2017, while the single was aired for the first time on radios;
 10 December 2016 Vimodrone inaugurated the municipal library "Lea Garofalo", also dedicating it to all the mafia's victims. In the same day, Luigi Ciotti became an honorary citizen of Vimodrone;
 2018, a bridge was named for Lea Garofalo in the province of Lamezia Terme;
 30 November 2019 the municipality of Rho renamed the Parco Goglio in honor of Lea Garofalo;
 2 June 2020 the graphic novel Lea Garofalo, una madre contro la 'ndrangheta was republished by the online journal il Fatto Quotidiano within the series Chiedi chi erano gli eroi, with the contribution of Marco Tullio Giordana and some processual documents.

See also
 List of victims of the 'Ndrangheta
 Italian Mafia
 'NdranghetaReferences 

Bibliography
 Paolo De Chiara (2012): Il coraggio di dire no - Lea Garofalo, la donna che sfidò la 'ndrangheta, Cosenza, Falco Editore with the preface of Enrico Fierro and introduction of Giulio Cavalli.  , 
 Marika Demaria (2013):La scelta di Lea - Lea Garofalo, la ribellione di una donna alla 'ndrangheta'', Milan, Melampo. with the preface of Nando Dalla Chiesa. , .

External links

 
 
 

Burials at the Cimitero Monumentale di Milano
People murdered by the 'Ndrangheta
Pentiti
21st-century Roman Catholic martyrs
People murdered in Lombardy